{{DISPLAYTITLE:C21H28O4}}
The molecular formula C21H28O4 may refer to:

 11-Dehydrocorticosterone
 18-Deoxyaldosterone
 21-Deoxycortisone
 Deprodone
 Formebolone
 7-Keto-DHEA acetate
 11-Nor-9-carboxy-THC